The English Concert is a baroque orchestra playing on period instruments based in London. Founded in 1972 and directed from the harpsichord by Trevor Pinnock for 30 years, it is now directed by harpsichordist Harry Bicket.  Nadja Zwiener has been orchestra leader (concertmaster) since September 2007.

The English Concert and Choir

The English Concert was founded by Trevor Pinnock and others in November 1972. The date of foundation is often given as 1973, probably because they started with seven people and only later progressed onto the orchestral repertoire as their number increased. They were one of the first orchestras dedicated to performing baroque and classical music on period instruments, their repertoire from then to now ranging approximately from Monteverdi to Mozart.

Their London debut was at the English Bach Festival in 1973, which led to their first recording in 1974, Sons of Bach harpsichord concertos, on CRD records. They first played at The Proms in 1980, and toured North America in 1983. The group gained much recognition from their prolific number of recordings with Archiv Produktion from 1978 until 1995, during which they recorded most of the major baroque repertoire.

The Choir of the English Concert (or permutations of that phrase), was formed in 1983 to perform Rameau's Acante et Céphise. It continued assembling as needed for recordings and performances with the group until the mid-1990s, when the decision was made to make it a regular choir on a level with the orchestra, in preparation for their performance of Bach's Mass in B Minor. Performances of oratorios and large-scale vocal works became more common after this. Rather than use established soloists in the arias and solo sections of these works, the choir was thought to be so good that the soloist material was shared amongst the regular members, a practice that Andrew Manze continued.

From 1996 to 2001 The English Concert was engaged in a major concert project entitled 'Great Religious Works of the 18th Century'. This was launched with Messiah performances, continuing in 1997 with J. S. Bach's Mass in B Minor performed in Italy, France, Germany, Austria and at the BBC Proms. Next was Bach's St. John Passion and Mozart's Requiem in 1999. In 2000 there were 18 performances of Bach's St. Matthew Passion, in locations from Tenerife to Tokyo. The six-year cycle was completed with a performance of Haydn's Die Schöpfung at the 2001 Lucerne Festival. The Christmas Oratorio was performed in Spain, Italy and Germany in December 2002.

Trevor Pinnock stepped down as director in 2003 to pursue solo and other conducting projects. Orchestra members decided to hand over to violinist Andrew Manze, who was at that time associate director of The Academy of Ancient Music. One of his first projects as director was a reconstruction of the first performance (in 1717) of Handel's Water Music, sailing down the River Thames on a barge. This was filmed for the BBC and released on DVD. With Manze's leadership came a new series of recordings with Harmonia Mundi.

The English Concert continues to appear at the major London venues, including the Wigmore Hall, Cadogan Hall and South Bank Centre, as well as touring internationally and playing at major music festivals. In September 2007, harpsichordist Harry Bicket succeeded Andrew Manze as director. Notable collaborations in the last three seasons have been with such internationally acclaimed figures in historical performance as violinist Fabio Biondi, oboist Alfredo Bernardini, conductor Laurence Cummings, director Rinaldo Alessandrini, harpsichordist Mahan Esfahani, soprano Elizabeth Watts, countertenor David Daniels, and director and recorder player Maurice Steger.

Related ensembles

There was, for a time, a chamber ensemble drawn from the principal members, The English Concert Chamber Ensemble, which released a few recordings as 'Members of The English Concert' or using their individual names. The English Concert Winds were a group of wind players from the orchestra who released a recording.

Some notable past members

Violin:
Simon Standage – leader 1972–1991 – left to direct Collegium Musicum 90 and become associate director of the Academy of Ancient Music
Elizabeth Wilcock
Micaela Comberti
Graham Cracknell
Peter Hanson – leader 1992–1997 – now leads the Orchestre Révolutionnaire et Romantique
Rachel Podger – leader 1997–2002
Roy Goodman
John Holloway

Viola:
 Trevor Jones
 Katherine McGillivray
 Alfonso Leal del Ojo Chamorro
 Louise Hogan

Cello:
Anthony Pleeth – 1972–1985
Jaap ter Linden
David Watkin
 Jane Coe
 Alison McGillivray
 Jonathan Manson
 Joseph Crouch
 Richard Webb

Violone:
 Keith Marjoram
Amanda MacNamara
Peter McCarthy

Recorder:
Philip Pickett

Horn:
Anthony Halstead

Flute:
Stephen Preston
Nicholas McGegan
Lisa Beznosiuk

Oboe:
David Reichenberg
Paul Goodwin

Bassoon:
 Alberto Grazzi

Lute:
Nigel North

Trumpet:
 Michael Laird

Recordings

Under the direction of Andrew Manze:

C.P.E. Bach: Symphonies Wq.183 and cello concerto
Biber: Missa Christi resurgentis
Handel: As steals the morn... arias & scenes for tenor (with Mark Padmore, tenor)
Mozart: Eine Kleine Nachtmusik
Mozart: violin concertos nos. 1, 2, 3, 4, 5.
Vivaldi: seven concertos ‘for the Holy Roman Emperor’

Under the direction of Harry Bicket:

Bach: Brandenburg Concertos & Orchestral Suites (with David Daniels, countertenor)
Handel: Arias (with Alice Coote, mezzo-soprano)

Notes and references

External links
The English Concert official website
Bach-cantatas.com: The English Concert
Picture of recording of Bach's 4-harpsichord concerto in 1981
Picture from the late 1980s

British early music ensembles
Early music orchestras
Early music choirs
London choirs
London orchestras
Musical groups established in 1972
1972 establishments in England